Asif Mahmood Jah is a Pakistani philanthropist, Customs officer, Medical Doctor, Social worker and Writer.

Literary works
Jah authored about 25 books He also writes for various newspapers.

Award and honors
 Sitara-i-Imtiaz (2015)
 Hilal-i-Imtiaz (2021)

References

Living people
Pakistani philanthropists
Pakistani writers
Recipients of Sitara-i-Imtiaz
Recipients of Hilal-i-Imtiaz
Pakistani social workers
King Edward Medical University alumni
Year of birth missing (living people)
Pakistani civil servants
Pakistani medical doctors